

Lok Sabha Election Results

State Election Results

Results from the Election Commission of India website. Results does not deal with  defections and by-elections during the mandate period.

See also
 Communist Marxist Party, in Kerala, south India
 Communist Party of India (Marxist)
 Communist Party of Revolutionary Marxists, in West Bengal, India northern areas
 Marxist Communist Party of India
 Marxist Communist Party of India (United)
 Marxist Periarist Communist Party, in Tamil Nadu, India

References

Election results in India
Communist Party of India (Marxist)
Election results by party